Sepia elongata is a species of cuttlefish native to the northwestern Indian Ocean, specifically from the Red Sea to Somalia. The depth range of S. elongata is unknown.

Sepia elongata grows to a mantle length of 97 mm.

The type specimen was collected near Cossier in the Red Sea. It is deposited at the Muséum National d'Histoire Naturelle in Paris.

References

External links

Cuttlefish